The 2007 IFAF World Championship was the third instance of the IFAF World Championship, the quadrennial international American football world championship tournament. It was held July 7–15, 2007 in Kawasaki, Kanagawa, Japan.

Venues

Participants 
 (qualify automatically as host)
 (European champion)

 (invitee)

 (Winner of Asia/Oceania Playoff)

Matches

Group 1

Group 2

5th place

3rd place

Final

The United States competed for the first time in the 2007 IFAF World Cup. Japan was making their third appearance in the finals, winning the previous two World Championships. Japan took a 17-10 lead with seven minutes and seven seconds left in regulation. University of Arizona quarterback Adam Austin guided Team USA with an 11-play, 80-yard drive that ended with the second 5-yard touchdown run by RB Kyle Kasperbauer, to tie the game at 17. IFAF follows the overtime system used by the NCAA, and both teams scored field goals with their first OT possession. In the second overtime, Japan got the ball first but missed a 34-yard field goal attempt. Team USA then reached Japan's 6-yard line. On 4th and one, Craig Coffin kicked the game winning 22-yard field goal, with the final score at 23-20. University of Nebraska-Omaha running back Kyle Kasperbauer was named MVP of the game after scoring two touchdowns and running for 54 yards on 15 carries.

0-7   Kasperbauer  5  yard run (Coffin kick) (1-9:03)
7-7   Kihira       2  yard pass from Tomizawa (Kaneoya kick) (2-10:51)
10-7   Kaneoya      49 yard field goal (2-8:02)
10-10  Coffin       35 yard field goal (3-4:18)
17-10  Mayuzumi     6  yard pass from Tomizawa (Kaneoya kick) (4-7:07)
17-17  Kasperbauer  5  yard run (Coffin kick) (4-2:51)
17-20  Coffin       43 yard field goal (OT1-0:00)
20-20  Kaneoya      25 yard field goal (OT1-0:00)
20-23  Coffin       22 yard field goal (OT2-0:00)

Attendance: 10,231

Team Statistics          Japan             USA
          -----             ---
First Downs              13                14

Rushing Plays            34                32
Net Yards Rushing        92                128

Attempts-Completions     25-17             12-25
Net Yards Passing        166               109

Fumbles Lost             1                 3
Interceptions            1                 1

Penalties-Yards          1-15              3-30

Time of Possession       27:45             20:15

Individual Statistics

Rushing:
Japan - Furutani 13-61, Ishino 3-15, M. Maeda 4-7, Namiki 2-6, Shimizu 3-5, Tomizawa 2-2,
Takata 7-(-4)

USA - Kasperbauer 15-65, Blakowski 10-55, W. Johnson 4-13, Austin 3-(-5)

Passing:
Japan - Tomizawa 20-14-140-2-0, Takata 4-3-26-0-1, Nakajima 1-0-0-0-0

USA - Austin 25-12-109-1-0

Receiving:
Japan - Hasegawa 3-37, Nakajima 3-29, Furutani 3-23, Shimizu 2-24, Yoneyama 2-12,
Mayuzumi 2-11, M. Maeda 1-28, Kihira 1-2

USA - Drenckhahn 5-40, Lewis 2-20, Odom 2/19, Thompson 1-13, Awrey 1-11, Childs 1-6

Winner

Statistics

External links
 

IFAF World Championship
World Cup, IFAF
Ifaf World Cup, 2007
International sports competitions hosted by Japan
American football in Japan